Ibrahim Pasha may refer to the following Ottoman statesmen:

 Çandarlı Ibrahim Pasha (died 1429), Ottoman statesman, grand vizier to Murad II
 Çandarlı Ibrahim Pasha (died 1499), Ottoman statesman, grand vizier to Bayezid II, grandson of Çandarlı Ibrahim Pasha
 Pargalı Ibrahim Pasha (1493–1536), Ottoman statesman, grand vizier to Suleiman the Magnificent (1523–1536), and governor of Egypt (1525)
 Damad Ibrahim Pasha (died 1601), Ottoman statesman, grand vizier to Ahmed II
 Maktul Hacı Ibrahim Pasha (died 1604), Ottoman statesman, governor of Egypt (1604), murdered in mutiny
 Ibrahim Pasha (Ottoman governor of Bosnia) (fl. 1610–1620), Ottoman governor of Bosnia
 Deli Ibrahim Pasha (fl. 1620–1630), Ottoman governor of Bosnia
 Defterdarzade Ibrahim Pasha (fl. 1639), Ottoman Minister of Finance
 Gabela Ibrahim Pasha (fl. 1645), Ottoman governor of Bosnia
 Ibrahim Pasha of Algiers (fl. 1657–1659), Ottoman governor of the Regency of Algiers
 Teşnak Ibrahim Pasha (fl. 1670), Ottoman governor of Bosnia
 Koca Arnaud Ibrahim Pasha (fl. 1670), Ottoman governor of Bosnia
 Bayburtlu Kara Ibrahim Pasha (died 1687), Ottoman statesman, grand vizier (1683–1685), and governor of Egypt (1669–1673)
 Ibrahim-pasha (fl. 1690–1700), Ottoman governor of Temeşvar Eyalet
 Hacı Ibrahim Pasha (fl. 1703), Ottoman governor of Bosnia
 Hoca Ibrahim Pasha (fl. 1713), Ottoman grand vizier
 Moralı Ibrahim Pasha (died 1725), Ottoman statesman, governor of various provinces, including Egypt (1709–1710)
 Kabakulak Ibrahim Pasha (fl. 1730), Ottoman grand vizier, governor of Bosnia
 Nevşehirli Damat Ibrahim Pasha (1666–1730), Ottoman statesman, grand vizier during the Tulip Era
 Ibrahim Pasha al-Azm (fl. 1740), Ottoman governor of Sidon Eyalet
 Hacı Ibrahim Pasha (died 1775), Ottoman statesman and governor of Egypt (1774–1775)
 Eğribozlu İbrahim Pasha ( 1758–1768), Ottoman Grand Admiral, see list of Kapudan Pashas
 Ibrahim Pasha of Berat, 18th-century ruler of the Pashalik of Berat
 Ibrahim Pasha Baban ( 1783–1784), Kurdish leader who founded Sulaymaniyah
 Ibrahim Pasha al-Halabi (fl. 1788–1789), Ottoman governor of Damascus
 Ibrahim Pasha Qataraghasi, Ottoman governor of Aleppo and Damascus
 Ibrahim Bushati (died 1810), Pasha of Shkodër
 Ibrahim Pasha of Egypt (1789–1848), Egyptian general and eldest son of Muhammad Ali of Egypt
 Hilmi Ibrahim Pasha (fl. 1800–1820), Ottoman governor of Bosnia and Crete
 Ibrahim Sarim Pasha (1801–1853), Ottoman statesman
 Ibrahim Dervish Pasha (fl. 1872), Ottoman governor of Bosnia
 Ibrahim Edhem Pasha (1819–1893), Ottoman statesman, grand vizier to Abdulhamid II
 Ali Ibrahim Pasha, Egypt Minister of Education (1879–1881)
 Ibrahim Ilhami Pasha (1836–1860), son of Abbas I of Egypt
 Ibrahim Fehmi Pasha (1838–1896), Ottoman statesman
 Ibrahim Hakki Pasha (1862–1918), Ottoman statesman
 Abdel Fattah Yahya Ibrahim Pasha (1876–1951), Egyptian political figure